Quidenham is a small rural village and civil parish in the English county of Norfolk.
For the purposes of local government, it falls within the district of Breckland.

The place-name 'Quidenham' is first attested in the Domesday Book of 1086, where it appears as 'Cuidenham', and means 'Cwida's ham or village'. The name 'Cwida' corresponds to the Old High German name 'Quito'.

There is a local tradition that Queen Boudica or Boadicea is buried in Quidenham.

Quidenham Hall is now a monastery of Carmelite nuns. A hospice for sick children occupies the site of some former staff cottages on the property. It is run independently of the monastery under the management of East Anglia's Children's Hospices (EACH), a registered charity under the patronage of the Princess of Wales.

The church of Quidenham St Andrew is one of 124 existing round-tower churches in Norfolk.

Quidenham was the location of the music festival Play Fest, which ran for two years from 2011 until 2013.

The civil parish includes the historic parish and still separate settlement of Wilby, which has its own historic church. Further, the old parishes of Eccles and Hargham now form part of Quidenham civil parish, each with their own historic church still in existence.

Snetterton Motor Racing Circuit is partially located in Quidenham parish, albeit  to the north-west of the village. Eccles Road railway station, on the Breckland Line between Cambridge and Norwich, is a similar distance to the north of the village.

References

External links

Information from Genuki Norfolk on Quidenham.
1854 description of Quidenham.
1883 description of Quidenham.
Website with photos of Quidenham St Andrew, a round-tower church

 
Villages in Norfolk
Civil parishes in Norfolk
Breckland District